Peshawar Division is an administrative division of Khyber Pakhtunkhwa Province, Pakistan. It was abolished in the reforms of 2000, like all divisions, but reinstated in 2008. At independence in 1947, the Khyber Pakhtunkhwa (then North-West Frontier Province) was split into two divisions, Dera Ismail Khan and Peshawar. Until 1976, Peshawar Division contained the districts of Hazara and Kohat, when they both became divisions themselves. Later in the mid-1990s, the district of Mardan (and its tehsils) also became a division itself.

Districts 
Peshawar Division contains the following districts:

 Charsadda District
 Nowshera District
 Peshawar District
 Khyber District
 Mohmand District

Tehsils in Peshawar District
Following are Tehsils of Peshawar division 

 Peshawar City Tehsil
 Shahalam Tehsil 
  Badabher Tehsil
 Mathra Tehsil
 Chamkani Tehsil
 Pashtakhar Tehsil
 Hassan Khel Tehsil
 Charsadda Tehsil
 Tangi Tehsil
 Shabqadar Tehsil
 Nowshera
 Jahangira Tehsil 
 Pabbi Teshil 
 Jamrud Tehsil
 Bara Tehsil
 Landikotal Tehsil 
 Upper Mohmand Tehsil
 Lower Mohmand Tehsil
 Central Mohmand Tehsil

See also
 Hazara Division
 Kohat Division
 Mardan Division

References

Divisions of Khyber Pakhtunkhwa
Peshawar